Shakawe Airport  is an airport serving Shakawe, a village in the North-West District of Botswana.

It is the gateway to the northern part of the Okavango Delta and the Linyati area.  Direct charter flights are operated to the aerodrome. It is owned by the Department of Civil Aviation.

See also

Transport in Botswana
List of airports in Botswana

References

External links
OpenStreetMap - Shakawe
OurAirports - Shakawe
Fallingrain - Shakawe Airport

Airports in Botswana
North-West District (Botswana)